Kayden Coleman (born July 5, 1986) is an American transgender advocate, educator, and social media influencer. He is known for raising awareness of transmasculine men who experience pregnancy. In 2013, when Coleman was 4 years into gender reassignment therapy, he found out he was pregnant with his and his partner's first child. Since then, Coleman has been interviewed by news outlets such as USA Today, TODAY.com, and Out about his experiences with transgender pregnancy. In 2021, he was honored by Out as an Out100 honoree, a recognition given to prominent members of the LGBTQ+ community for their outstanding work promoting LGBTQ+ rights. He has appeared in a commercial for Lexus. Coleman currently offers workshops, sensitivity training, consultations, speaking engagements, and online brand promotions that seek to educate the public on transgender fertility, medical racism, pregnancy, disability awareness, and parenting.

Early life 
Coleman was born on July 5, 1986. He is of Jamaican and African descent. As a child who was assigned female at birth, Coleman experienced feelings of gender dysphoria, which led to his later gender transition.

Health and transition 
Coleman first began testosterone hormone therapy in January of 2009. He underwent breast reduction surgery, better known today as top surgery, in March of 2013. To do so, he paused hormone treatment, a practice which has since been shown to have little evidence in support of health outcomes. As a result, Coleman became pregnant in early 2013. General medical knowledge at the time assumed that testosterone hormone therapy made recipients permanently infertile; however, it has since been discovered that while actively taking testosterone reduces fertility in transmasculine individuals, it neither prevents it, nor does it have an effect on future egg yields. He did not become aware of his pregnancy for five and a half months. In February of 2020, Coleman announced his second pregnancy. He gave birth to his second daughter later that summer.

Coleman refuses to undergo genital reconstructive surgery, known more colloquially as bottom surgery, citing issues in regard to cost, health complications, and sexual pleasure. On his YouTube channel, Coleman has educated viewers on what bottom surgery procedures are available for transmasculine people.

In November of 2021, Coleman was diagnosed with renal cell carcinoma. He has used his social media platforms to shed light on issues that disabled transgender people face, encouraging his followers to be mindful of ableist sentiments or language.

Career and activism 
Coleman is an advocate for LGBTQ+ rights and inclusion, with specific focus on fertility and pregnancy issues that affect Black, gay, and transmasculine individuals. He calls himself "Papa Seahorse," as male seahorses are known for carrying fertilized eggs in their stomachs, much like pregnant humans. He has been vocal about the racism and transphobia that he has faced as in the American medical system, sharing that a few of his medical providers have suggested that he undergo an abortion. He has spoken about being misgendered by medical professionals, as well as his difficulty in accessing classes for birthing, chest feeding, and postpartum support groups, because they were labeled as women's spaces and thus were inaccessible to men.

After the birth of his first daughter, Coleman experienced postpartum depression, PTSD, anxiety, and other after-effects of childbirth, which led him to seek out doulas who helped him alleviate his symptoms. He has praised doulas for exhibiting more understanding and empathy for transmasculine pregnant people than some medical providers.

When interviewed by journalist and author Kimberly Seals Allers on her podcast Birthright, Coleman described his entrance into activism as a response to general lack of knowledge surrounding LGBTQ lives. He cited his astonishment at the stereotype that pictures transgender individuals as pedophiles, as well as inherently incompetent parents. As a result, much of his activism sets out to disprove these stereotypes, educating the public on transgender issues that receive little media attention.

In addition to advocating for trans rights and representation within the medical industry, Coleman has spoken at length about broader obstacles and stigmas faced by trans individuals, including trans discrimination in state and federal legislation, anti-Blackness in predominantly white transmasculine communities, and the exploitation of trans people by cisgender people for profit.

He and his partner, Dominique Glinton, have appeared in a commercial for Lexus, titled "The Evolution of Family," in which they share their experiences of fatherhood.

Personal life 
Coleman married his first husband, Elijah, in 2013. In 2013, Coleman gave birth to their daughter, Azaelia Skye, in early 2014. In January of 2020, Coleman announced his second pregnancy with his partner, Dominique. Their daughter, Jurnee, was born later that year.

References 

Transgender men
1986 births
Living people
Transgender rights activists
LGBT African Americans
African-American activists
American people of Jamaican descent
American LGBT rights activists